Pangasinan is a coastal province in the Philippines, on the island of Luzon.

Pangasinan or Pangasinense may also refer to:
 Pangasinan people, one of the indigenous peoples of the Philippines
 Pangasinan language, a Malayo-Polynesian language
 Pangasinan literature
 Pangasinan Island in the Sulu Archipelago, Philippines